Jennifer Gutierrez (born April 28, 1967) is a triathlete from the United States. 
 
Gutierrez competed at the first Olympic triathlon at the 2000 Summer Olympics and she was the first American to qualify as a triathlete for the 2000 Olympics.  She took thirteenth place with a total time of 2:03:38.48.

Gutierrez graduated from Oliver Wendell Holmes High School in San Antonio, Texas. She is a graduate of Pepperdine University where she was a four-year letter winner in swimming. She did her first triathlon in 1994 and became a professional in 1995. She placed fourth at the 1999 Pan American Games.

References

1967 births
Living people
Sportspeople from San Antonio
American female triathletes
Triathletes at the 1999 Pan American Games
Pan American Games competitors for the United States
Olympic triathletes of the United States
Triathletes at the 2000 Summer Olympics
21st-century American women